Paradelta Parma srl is an Italian aircraft manufacturer based in Parma and founded in 1980. The company specializes in the design and manufacture of paragliders in the form of ready-to-fly aircraft. The company also produces sewn banners, inflatables and windsocks.

The company is a società a responsabilità limitata (srl), an Italian limited liability venture.

By the mid-2000s the company was producing a full range of gliders including the competition Ben Hur and Breathless, the two-place BiBreak for flight training, the intermediate Bora and beginner Break.

Aircraft 
Summary of aircraft built by Paradelta Parma:
Paradelta Bamboo
Paradelta Basic
Paradelta Bat Bitch
Paradelta Ben Hur
Paradelta BiBreak
Paradelta Big Bang
Paradelta Billiard
Paradelta Bingo
Paradelta Blaster
Paradelta Blazer
Paradelta Bomber
Paradelta Bora
Paradelta Break
Paradelta Breathless
Paradelta Breeze
Paradelta Breeze Biposto
Paradelta Brio
Paradelta Broken Wind
Paradelta Bull Ball
Paradelta Super Breeze

References

External links

Aircraft manufacturers of Italy
Vehicle manufacturing companies established in 1980
Companies based in Parma
Paragliders
1980 establishments in Italy